Min Hla Htut of Pyakaung was the chief queen of Viceroy Sithu Kyawhtin of Toungoo (r. 1470–1481).

Brief
In her youth, the eldest daughter of Crown Prince Minye Kyawswa and Saw Min Hla, was known as the Princess of Pyakaung. She was later married to Sithu Kyawhtin, a member of Ava royalty.

The princess had two sons and a daughter: Min Sithu, Min Hla Nyet and Min Htwe. In 1470, she and the family moved to Toungoo after her husband was appointed governor of the rebellion-prone vassal state of Ava. Her elder brother Minye Kyawhtin of Toungoo had raised a rebellion there from 1451 to 1459. The future founders of Toungoo Dynasty descended from her. She was the maternal grandmother of King Mingyi Nyo, who broke away from Ava in 1510, and a maternal great-grandmother of King Tabinshwehti who founded the Toungoo Empire.

Ancestry
The princess was descended from Ava and Pagan royal lines from her father's side.

Notes

References

Bibliography
 
 
 

Ava dynasty
Burmese people of Shan descent